Joanne Morgan may refer to:

 Joanne Morgan (netball) (born 1979), Australian netball player
 Joanne Morgan (volleyball) (born 1983), British volleyball player